, also known as Gymnasium Baby, is a 2008 Japanese film directed by Yoshihiro Fukagawa and based on the novel of the same name by Keiko Kanome. The film stars Yūichi Nakamura as Jun Shibahara, Yūta Takahashi as Naoki Murai and Shō Kubo as Shōichi Kato. The film was released on May 10, 2008. The movie also has a sister film premiered simultaneously titled Classmates, which is composed of the same cast but with different plot and without BL themes.

Plot
Jun Shibahara is a high school student with high expectations for swimming, but as the team coach's son he is nicknamed "Taiikukan Baby" (gymnasium baby) and no one believes his position is due to his own merits. Jun also must deal with constant rumors that his father got his late mother pregnant (who was one of his students) and never married her, another reason why he is nicknamed like that. After being diagnosed with hypertrophic cardiomyopathy, Jun is forced to stop swimming and loses all reason to exist. During his visits to the hospital, he meets Nozomi Hayakawa, a classmate who has been admitted due to a cancer and he discovers that she has not much time left to live.

Shortly after, Naoki Murai (his replacement in the swimming team), asks Jun to be his coach since he admires him a lot. Jun and Murai begin to spend time together, and Murai soon confess his love for Jun and kiss him, a fact that leaves Jun confused. Jun tells what happened to his best friend Shōichi, who takes an overprotective attitude towards him and another defensive towards Murai, since he is also in love with Jun. Both boys swear a mutual rivalry that starts a complicated love triangle.

Murai and Kato compete in order to earn Jun's affections; however, Jun is not able to reciprocate the feelings of any of the two, since he is also dealing with his forced exit from the swimming world. Finally, on the day of the graduation, Murai tries to kiss Jun in the middle of the ceremony after receiving his diploma, only to be stopped by Kato, who bursts into the kiss by interposing a photograph of the already deceased Nozomi. A very frustrated and embarrassed Jun leaves the ceremony while telling both suitors to follow him; the film ends with the three boys walking away while laughing.

Cast
Yūichi Nakamura as Jun Shibahara
Yūta Takahashi as Naoki Murai
Shō Kubō as Shōichi Kato
Mirei Kiritani as Nozomi Hayakawa 
Nanami Sakuraba as Yūki Hayakawa
Makoto Kawahara as Hikari Ijima 
Tomoya Nagai as Makoto Fujisawa
Ema Fujisawa as Michiru Yada
Ikkei Watanabe as Yasushi Shibahara
Mayuko Irie as Nozomi's Mother

References

External links

2008 films
Films set in Japan
2000s Japanese-language films
Gay-related films
Japanese LGBT-related films
2008 romantic drama films
LGBT-related romantic drama films
2008 drama films
2008 LGBT-related films
2000s Japanese films